The 1971 Alberta general election was the seventeenth general election held in the Province of Alberta, Canada on August 30, 1971, to elect seventy-five members of the Alberta Legislature to form the 17th Alberta Legislative Assembly.

The Progressive Conservative Association of Alberta led by Peter Lougheed won 49 of 75 seats with 46.4 per cent of the popular vote in the new legislature to form a majority government. Lougheed's Progressive Conservatives defeated the incumbent Social Credit Party led by Premier Harry Strom who won 25 seats with 41.1 per cent of the popular vote.

The 1971 election ushered in the Progressive Conservative dynasty in Alberta, which continuously held a majority government for 44 years from 1971 to 2015. The election also marked the end of the Social Credit dynasty which had continuously held a majority government for 36 years from 1935 to 1971.

Background

1967 Alberta general election 

In the May 1967 election, Progressive Conservative leader Peter Lougheed and his supporters worked tirelessly to convince candidates to run in all 65 constituencies, however, the Progressive Conservatives were only able to nominate 47 candidates, two more than the Liberal Party with 45, but less than a full slate put forward by the Social Credit Party and the New Democratic Party.

Lougheed was subsequently elected to the legislature in Calgary-West garnering 62 per cent of the vote, and the Progressive Conservatives captured 26 per cent of the vote province-wide with five other successful candidates. With six elected MLAs, Lougheed became Leader of the Opposition. The group of elected Conservatives known as the "original six" included Calgary MLAs Len Werry, and David Russell; Edmonton area MLAs Lou Hyndman and Don Getty, and the party's only rural candidate and former federal Member of Parliament Hugh Horner. The Edmonton Journal remarked positively on Lougheed's success following the 1967 election, stating Albertans had a responsible and credible alternative as opposition.

Lead up to 1971 
Ernest C. Manning had resigned as Social Credit leader and premier in 1968 after 25 years in office, a year after leading the Socreds to their ninth consecutive majority government. His successor, Harry E. Strom, had been unable to revive a government increasingly seen as tired, complacent and old-fashioned. The Socreds had been in government for almost two generations, having won their first victory more than a decade before oil was found in a big way in Alberta.

Though the legislature's mandate from the 1967 election was not due to expire until May 1972, five years after it started, convention in Canadian politics is for legislatures to be dissolved every four years or less. Accordingly, Strom resolved to call an election in 1971, sometime between May and September. He briefly considered a spring campaign, in the hopes that the planting season would have farmers feeling optimistic and therefore inclined to support the incumbent government. However, after concluding that farmers would not react well to going to the polls in the middle of planting or harvest season, Strom finally settled on August 30.

The Progressive Conservatives, on the other hand, had significant momentum going into the 1971 election. Lougheed's Progressive Conservative caucus further grew from the "Original Six" with the election of Robert Dowling in the October 1969 Edson by-election, Bill Dickie a long-time friend of Lougheed crossing the floor from the Liberals to join his caucus in November 1969, and Banff-Cochrane independent representative Clarence Copithorne joining the party in April 1971. This growth saw the popular Lougheed-led Progressive Conservatives enter the August 1971 election with 10 incumbents.

Campaign

Social Credit campaign 
A campaign committee was assembled, and recommended a budget of $580,000. The party recruited star candidates, including Calgary alderman George Ho Lem and former Calgary Stampeder star Don Luzzi (Edmonton alderman and future mayor Cec Purves was defeated in his bid to win the Social Credit nomination in Edmonton-Strathcona from Strathcona Centre incumbent Joseph Donovan Ross), but was handicapped in these efforts by Strom's unwillingness to offer cabinet posts or other incentives to potential new candidates.  Strom's lack of personal charisma was also a liability: tellingly, of the large budget recommended by the central committee, only $72,000 was recommended for use on television advertising, where Strom did not shine. The party tried to revitalize the Premier's image through publicity movies, though efforts were mixed.  In one, which was pulled after a single showing, Strom appeared scowling in his living room, urging Albertans to lower their expectations of government.  Another, produced by Tommy Banks and showing Strom in a variety of settings talking about the province's changing face, was more successful.

The campaign did not give Social Credit partisans much reason for optimism.  Strom did not draw the crowds that Progressive Conservative opposition leader Peter Lougheed did, although an August 25 rally in Edmonton's Jubilee Auditorium featuring speeches by Strom and Manning was full.  After criticizing the Conservatives' medicare platform, which promised free medicare to Albertans older than 65, as spendthrift, Strom announced Social Credit's barely cheaper alternative: medicare to Albertans older than 65 for one dollar per month. The Edmonton Journal, which had earlier published a poll showing that a plurality of Edmontonians intended to vote Progressive Conservative, endorsed Lougheed for Premier.

Progressive Conservative campaign 
The Progressive Conservative Party had been preparing for an election to be called since mid-1970. The party developed slogans and branding which was one of the first instances in Alberta where political printing and branding was centrally controlled, with individual constituencies unable to develop their own materials. This centralization was intended to reinforce the party's key messages and ensure repetition in the eyes of voters. An advertising budget of $120,000 was set to provide $80,000 for television advertisements and the rest of other materials for constituencies across the province. Lougheed's focus on television contrasted Social Credit's use of radio for the less gregarious Strom. Lougheed's team was careful with messaging, stressing the idea of the Progressive Conservative providing an "alternative" rather than "opposition". Lougheed developed a 40-day schedule that brought him to each constituency to "meet and greet" with potential voters.

Election 
The 16th Legislature was prorogued on April 27, 1971, and dissolved three months later on July 22 with an election day set on August 30, 1971.

Electoral boundaries 
A number of electoral districts were redistributed following 1970 amendments to The Elections Act, which were informed by the 1968 Report of the Alberta Committee on Redistribution Procedure written by the Special Committee on Redistribution chaired by Social Credit member Frederick C. Colborne. The number of members elected to the legislature was increased from 65 to 75,

Voting and eligibility 
Amendments to the Age of Majority Act lowered the voting age from 21 to 18 years.

Aftermath 

The collapse of the other opposition parties made the Progressive Conservatives the only credible challenger to the Social Credit. The Progressive Conservatives took 46 per cent of the popular vote and won 49 of the 75 seats in the legislature, enough for a strong majority government. This would be the first of twelve consecutive victories for the PCs; they would remain in government without interruption until their defeat in 2015, making them the longest serving political dynasty in Canadian history.  The 1971 election is considered a classic example of a political realignment.

Social Credit garnered a record number of votes in this election compared to previous elections, which had been plagued by low turn-outs.  However, the Progressive Conservatives converted this slim lead into a large lead in seats due to their success in the province's two largest cities: Edmonton, where the Progressive Conservatives won every seat, and Calgary, where they took all but five. 

While many of the Social Credit losses came by small margins, those losses were enough to cost the party almost half of its caucus. Strom resigned as Social Credit leader a few months after the defeat. Election night saw Social Credit defeated, taking 25 seats to the Progressive Conservative's 49. Though Social Credit's share of the vote had only slipped slightly, losing five points, Lougheed benefited from a substantial reduction in the New Democrats' vote and a near-collapse of the Liberals'. The party was also decimated in the province's two largest cities, losing all of its seats in Edmonton and all but five in Calgary. Strom conceded defeat in Edmonton and returned home to Medicine Hat. The defeat sent Social Credit into headlong decline. Its membership in the Assembly shrank over the next ten years and disappeared altogether by 1982.

The Liberal Party was shut out of the legislature.  One Liberal, Bill Dickie, had crossed the floor to the PCs.  Another, William Switzer, died in 1969.  The remaining Liberal, Michael Maccagno, resigned to run, unsuccessfully as it turned out, for the federal Parliament.

Alberta New Democratic Party leader Grant Notley was the only one in his party to win election. He sat as the only New Democrat in the legislature until 1982. His daughter Rachel would lead the NDP to victory over the Progressive Conservatives in 2015, ending its 44 years in office.

Results

Daylight saving time plebiscite

Alberta voters participated in a province-wide plebiscite on the question of whether or not to endorse a proposal to adopt daylight saving time (summer time). The proposal was endorsed by voters with a wide margin of 61.37 per cent in approval.

Background 
In 1948, the Government of Alberta formally set the province's time zone with the passage of The Daylight Saving Time Act, which mandated the entire province observe Mountain Standard Time, and prevented any municipality from observing daylight saving time or any other time zone. The legislation came after Calgary (1946 and 1947), and Edmonton (1946) held municipal plebiscites that approved the move to daylight saving time.

Alberta's urban municipalities were largely in favour of daylight saving time and pressured the provincial government to hold a provincial plebiscite or permit municipalities to observe daylight saving time. The effort in the Legislature was spearheaded by Liberal MLA and Calgary Alderman Bill Dickie, who in March 1964 brought forward a motion to permit municipalities to hold plebiscites on the issue; the motion was defeated by the Social Credit government. At the time, Social Credit MLA William Patterson described daylight saving time as "that fandangled thing", and Minister Allen Russell Patrick stated municipal daylight saving time would be difficult for tourists to understand.

In February 1966, the Social Credit government finally gave in to the calls for a provincial plebiscite on daylight saving time, approving a motion submitted by Bill Dickie. The government responded on March 29, 1966, with Minister Alfred Hooke introducing An Act to amend The Daylight Saving Time Act (Bill 75) which amended the Daylight Saving Time Act to permit the government to hold a plebiscite on the issue. Alberta voters were asked the question "Do you favour Province-wide Daylight Saving Time?", during the 1967 Alberta general election. A narrow majority of 51.25 per cent of voters rejected daylight saving time. Most of the opposition was located in rural areas, while strong support for daylight saving time was seen in the cities of Calgary, Edmonton, Lethbridge, and Medicine Hat.

By 1967, each province besides Alberta and Saskatchewan had adopted daylight saving time. Many Alberta businesses provided for modified summer hours to coordinate with other provinces with daylight saving time, including the Alberta Stock Exchange which started at 7 a.m. to align with exchanges in Toronto and Montreal. Air Canada released a statement expressing the difficulty of distributing flight schedules with flights in Alberta.

After 25 years as Premier, Social Credit leader Ernest Manning stepped down on December 12, 1968, and his successor Harry Strom was sworn in as Premier. Only a few months later in April 1969, Strom announced Albertans would once again be asked to vote on daylight saving time in conjunction with the next scheduled provincial general election. During the announcement, Strom stated he was neutral on the topic and did not have a preference one way or another.

Campaign 

Once again Calgary residents and businessmen Bill Creighton and David Matthews led a campaign for daylight saving times, just as they did in 1967, arguing the benefits of an additional hour of late sunlight for sports. Creighton learned from the successful and well-funded "no" campaign in 1967 led by the Alberta Council for Standard Time and Calgary lawyer and drive-in movie operator R. H. Barron. Creighton and Matthews formed the "Yes for Daylight Saving Society" to advocate during the leadup to the 1971 plebiscite, mirroring the organized approach of the "no" campaign in 1967. The Edmonton chapter had a $1,000 budget for advertising and even crowned a "Miss Daylight Saving Time", who made appearances throughout Edmonton. The arguments made for daylight saving time were similar to 1967, more amateur sport time, saving 150 hours of electricity each summer and aligning Alberta with the eight other provinces that observed daylight saving time.

The primary opposition to daylight saving time was described by members of the "Yes for Daylight Saving Society" as farmers, housewives and drive-in movie operators. In the 1967 campaign, the Alberta Council for Standard Time was able to raise $30,000 for advertisements, but was much less vocal during the 1971 campaign. Unifarm, an agricultural organization opposed daylight saving time, but was not willing to spend significantly on a campaign.

Aftermath 

The 1971 plebiscite on daylight saving time resulted in an overwhelming majority of the Alberta population approving the transition. A statement from Unifarm, a farmer representative organization which opposed daylight saving time admitted that the organization anticipated the proposal would pass, but also downplayed the consequences for farmers. The new Progressive Conservative government highlighted the change to observe daylight saving in the Speech from the Throne in early March 1972, and Attorney-General Merv Leitch announced on March 14, 1972, that Alberta will officially observe daylight saving time, with the start date set for April 30, 1972, and lasting until October 29, 1972.

Results 

For break down of results see individual districts

Results by riding

Calgary 

|-
|Calgary-Bow|||
|Roy Wilson5,53947.84%
|
|Bill Wearmouth4,56339.41%
|
|
|
|Fred Spooner1,40712.15%
|
||||
|
|-
|Calgary-Buffalo
|
|Don Luzzi5,23842.31%|||
|Ronald H. Ghitter5,70546.09%
|
|
|
|Jane Ann Summers1,36411.02%
|
||||
|
|-
|Calgary-Currie
|
|Frederick C. Colborne4,67943.43%|||
|Fred H. Peacock5,25548.78%
|
|
|
|Margaret I. Jackson7917.34%
|
||||
|
|-
|Calgary-Egmont
|
|Pat O'Byrne5,50340.94%|||
|Merv Leitch6,79150.52%
|
|
|
|Ron Stuart1,0607.89%
|
||||
|
|-
|Calgary-Elbow
|
|L.A. Thorssen4,48041.63%|||
|David J. Russell5,54751.54%
|
|
|
|Dolores LeDrew6886.39%
|
||||
|
|-
|Calgary-Foothills
|
|Jay Salmon5,88539.30%|||
|Len F. Werry7,69351.38%
|
|
|
|James Staples1,3709.15%
|
||||
|
|-
|Calgary-Glenmore
|
|Raymond A. Kingsmith5,12237.21%|||
|William Daniel Dickie7,65855.64%
|
|
|
|George C. McGuire8065.86%
|
||||
|William Daniel Dickie
|-
|Calgary-McCall|||
|George Ho Lem5,11643.70%
|
|John Kushner4,18735.76%
|
|Natalie Chapman1511.29%
|
|Ted Takacs1,98416.95%
|
||||
|
|-
|Calgary-McKnight
|
|Jim Richards5,36841.60%|||
|Calvin E. Lee6,13447.54%
|
|Philip T. Keuber2461.91%
|
|Walter H. Siewert1,0978.50%
|
||||
|
|-
|Calgary-Millican|||
|Arthur J. Dixon4,53948.74%
|
|Norman Kwong2,97331.93%
|
|Carole Walter1531.64%
|
|Clarence Lacombe1,54316.57%
|
||||
|
|-
|Calgary-Mountain View|||
|Albert W. Ludwig4,99051.11%
|
|George Swales3,53336.19%
|
|
|
|E.C. Baldwin1,14911.77%
|
||||
|
|-
|Calgary-North Hill
|
|Robert A. Simpson4,90042.88%|||
|Roy Alexander Farran4,96143.41%
|
|
|
|Barry Pashak1,34111.74%
|
|Carl L. Riech (Ind.)1211.06%|||
|
|-
|Calgary-West
|
|Charles Grey4,31933.68%|||
|Peter Lougheed7,04954.96%
|
|Brian Stevenson3332.60%
|
|Joe Yanchula1,0668.31%
|
||||
|Peter Lougheed
|}

Edmonton 

|-
|Edmonton-Avonmore
|
|Joe G. Radstaak3,68139.87%|||
|Horst A. Schmid3,91342.39%
|
|John Kloster2572.78%
|
|Bill McLean1,30314.11%
|
||||
|
|-
|Edmonton-Belmont
|
|Werner G. Schmidt4,05233.42%|||
|Albert Edward Hohol6,01849.63%
|
|
|
|Gordon S.B. Wright1,96016.16%
|
||||
|
|-
|Edmonton-Beverly
|
|Lou W. Heard3,05028.95%|||
|Bill W. Diachuk4,47142.44%
|
|John Lambert1851.76%
|
|Barrie Chivers2,76926.28%
|
||||
|
|-
|Edmonton-Calder
|
|Edgar H. Gerhart3,65332.03%|||
|Tom Chambers5,93152.01%
|
|
|
|Bill Glass1,77215.54%
|
||||
|
|-
|Edmonton-Centre
|
|Gerry Mulhall2,62228.91%|||
|Gordon Miniely5,28158.23%
|
|Leonard Stahl1972.17%
|
|Linda Gaboury93110.27%
|
||||
|Ambrose Holowach
|-
|Edmonton-Glenora
|
|Lou Letourneau4,00131.09%|||
|Lou Hyndman7,66159.53%
|
|Sol Estrin3222.50%
|
|Mary Lou Pocklington8486.59%
|
||||
|
|-
|Edmonton-Gold Bar
|
|William F. Young3,77835.31%|||
|William Yurko5,78954.10%
|
|
|
|Tom Hennessey1,08210.11%
|
||||
|
|-
|Edmonton-Highlands
|
|Ambrose Holowach2,74838.05%|||
|David T. King2,84839.43%
|
|Gerald Lorente1542.13%
|
|Leroy Pearch1,36818.94%
|
||||
|
|-
|Edmonton-Jasper Place
|
|John B. Ludwig3,78933.72%|||
|Leslie Gordon Young5,75851.25%
|
|Edwin Robert Daniels2412.15%
|
|Kenneth Joseph Kerr1,40212.48%
|
||||
|John William Horan
|-
|Edmonton-Kingsway
|
|Ethel Sylvia Wilson3,53530.92%|||
|Kenneth R.H. Paproski6,31655.25%
|
|Roderick Woodcock1991.74%
|
|Paulette Atterbury1,29011.28%
|
||||
|
|-
|Edmonton-Meadowlark
|
|Alexander Romaniuk3,83934.05%|||
|Gerard Joseph Amerongen6,37156.52%
|
|
|
|Alan J. Idiens1,0359.18%
|
||||
|
|-
|Edmonton-Norwood
|
|Irene Domecki3,61835.80%|||
|Catherine Chichak4,33442.89%
|
|
|
|Sam Lee1,95419.34%
|
||||
|William Tomyn
|-
|Edmonton-Ottewell
|
|Ronald Penner4,18832.73%|||
|John G. Ashton7,00954.77%
|
|
|
|Donald Haythorne1,31410.27%
|
||||
|
|-
|Edmonton-Parkallen
|
|Gordon V. Rasmussen3,87535.84%|||
|Neil S. Crawford5,30049.02%
|
|Vic Yanda2212.04%
|
|Hart Horn1,31112.13%
|
||||
|
|-
|Edmonton-Strathcona
|
|Joseph Donovan Ross2,97332.55%|||
|Julian Koziak4,54149.72%
|
|
|
|Timothy Christian1,57417.23%
|
||||
|
|-
|Edmonton-Whitemud
|
|Donald Murray Hamilton4,69033.06%|||
|Donald Ross Getty8,20157.81%
|
|James N. Tanner2351.66%
|
|Joseph Mercredi9366.60%
|
||||
|
|-
|}

Rest of Alberta 

|-
|Athabasca
|
|Allan Gerlach2,58536.76%|||
|Frank Appleby3,26146.37%
|
|
|
|Peter E. Opryshko1,13616.15%
|
||||
|Antonio Aloisio
|-
|Banff-Cochrane
|
|Slim Martin2,64737.52%|||
|Clarence Copithorne3,80153.88%
|
|
|
|Beverly Coulter4205.95%
|
||||
|Clarence Copithorne
|-
|Barrhead
|
|Simon Tuininga1,65129.10%|||
|Hugh F. Horner3,36059.23%
|
|
|
|Herman Burke64311.33%
|
||||
|
|-
|Bonnyville
|
|Lorne Mowers2,35543.31%|||
|Donald Hansen2,52346.40%
|
|
|
|Claire Gaines5399.91%
|
||||
|Romeo B. Lamothe
|-
|Bow Valley|||
|Fred T. Mandeville3,58467.66%
|
|Don Murray1,67431.60%
|
|
|
|
|
||||
|
|-
|Camrose
|
|Laurence Rhierson3,96541.52%|||
|Gordon Stromberg4,55247.67%
|
|
|
|Keith Boulter98810.35%
|
||||
|Chester I. Sayers
|-
|Cardston|||
|Edgar W. Hinman2,83153.56%
|
|Larry L. Lang2,39245.25%
|
|
|
|
|
||||
|Alvin F. Bullock
|-
|Clover Bar|||
|Walt A. Buck4,04148.86%
|
|J. Devereux3,46841.93%
|
|
|
|A. Karvonen7368.90%
|
||||
|Walt A. Buck
|-
|Cypress|||
|Harry E. Strom2,77760.15%
|
|Dave Berntson1,63535.41%
|
|
|
|Tony de Souza1964.25%
|
||||
|Harry E. Strom
|-
|Drayton Valley
|
|Thomas Johnson1,30426.62%|||
|Rudolph Zander2,60353.14%
|
|
|
|Alvin Harmacy96319.66%
|
||||
|
|-
|Drumheller|||
|Gordon Edward Taylor5,04463.56%
|
|Wayne Ohlhauser2,28528.79%
|
|
|
|Dick Hehr5476.89%
|
||||
|
|-
|Edson
|
|Rollie Mohr1,94728.58%|||
|Robert W. Dowling3,90057.24%
|
|
|
|Walter Seewitz74910.99%
|
||||
|Robert W. Dowling
|-
|Grande Prairie
|
|William Bowes4,10438.42%|||
|Winston Backus4,55342.63%
|
|
|
|Arthur Macklin1,99218.65%
|
||||
|Ira McLaughlin
|-
|Hanna-Oyen|||
|Clinton Keith French2,23145.58%
|
|John Edward Butler2,21645.27%
|
|
|
|Gordon Snell4148.46%
|
||||
|
|-
|Highwood|||
|Edward P. Benoit2,94147.82%
|
|Eldon C. Couey2,78945.35%
|
|
|
|D. Larry McKillop3896.33%
|
||||
|
|-
|Innisfail
|
|William Kenneth Ure2,91546.95%|||
|Clifford L. Doan3,23552.10%
|
|
|
|
|
||||
|
|-
|Lac La Biche-McMurray|||
|Dan Bouvier2,67952.97%
|
|Elmer Roy1,92738.10%
|
|
|
|Kenneth B. Orchard4148.19%
|
||||
|
|-
|Lacombe
|
|Ivan Stonehocker2,58242.02%|||
|John William Cookson3,09450.36%
|
|
|
|Ragnar Johanson4527.36%
|
||||
|Allan Russell Patrick
|-
|Lesser Slave Lake|||
|Dennis Barton1,83040.98%
|
|Garth Roberts1,43432.11%
|
|Stan Daniels2465.51%
|
|Marie Carlson67015.00%
|
|Allan Crawford (Ind.)2315.17%|||
|
|-
|Lethbridge-East|||
|John V. Anderson5,34150.27%
|
|Richard Barton4,37441.17%
|
|
|
|Douglas Poile8057.58%
|
||||
|
|-
|Lethbridge-West|||
|Richard David Gruenwald4,16954.39%
|
|R.J. Gray2,75135.89%
|
|
|
|Klaas Buijert6708.74%
|
||||
|
|-
|Little Bow|||
|Raymond Albert Speaker3,40058.42%
|
|John C. Green2,11436.32%
|
|
|
|Edward H. Rodney2955.07%
|
||||
|Raymond Albert Speaker
|-
|Lloydminster
|
|Campbell A. Hancock2,58542.95%|||
|James Edgar Miller2,77446.09%
|
|
|
|Lloyd Robertson63510.55%
|
||||
|
|-
|Macleod|||
|Leighton E. Buckwell3,39950.67%
|
|Danny Le Grandeur2,80841.86%
|
|
|
|Sid J. Cornish4707.01%
|
||||
|Leighton E. Buckwell
|-
|Medicine Hat-Redcliff|||
|William Wyse6,44748.68%
|
|James Horsman4,14031.26%
|
|Theodore Anhorn4623.49%
|
|Frank Armstrong2,12816.07%
|
||||
|
|-
|Olds-Didsbury|||
|Robert Curtis Clark4,34659.36%
|
|Rudolf Pedersen2,57835.21%
|
|
|
|William C. McCutcheon3665.00%
|
||||
|Robert Curtis Clark
|-
|Peace River
|
|Robert H. Wiebe2,43738.04%|||
|Al (Boomer) Adair3,18849.77%
|
|
|
|Hans Jorgensen72211.27%
|
||||
|Robert H. Wiebe
|-
|Pincher Creek-Crowsnest|||
|Charles Duncan Drain2,37942.82%
|
|Morgan Johnson1,79132.24%
|
|
|
|Clarence W. Smith1,35524.39%
|
||||
|Charles Duncan Drain
|-
|Ponoka
|
|Neville S. Roper2,69543.69%|||
|Donald J. McCrimmon2,71243.96%
|
|Bernice Luce1422.30%
|
|Ed Nelson5989.69%
|
||||
|Neville S. Roper
|-
|Red Deer
|
|Fulton Rollings3,62734.79%|||
|James L. Foster4,99447.90%
|
|Len Patterson7617.30%
|
|Ethel Taylor1,0229.80%
|
||||
|William Kenneth Ure
|-
|Redwater-Andrew
|
|Michael Senych2,27134.67%|||
|George Topolnisky3,27750.02%
|
|
|
|Norman T. Flach96814.78%
|
||||
|
|-
|Rocky Mountain House
|
|Harvey Staudinger2,47240.01%|||
|Helen Hunley3,01448.78%
|
|
|
|David Elliot65710.63%
|
||||
|Alfred J. Hooke
|-
|Sedgewick-Coronation|||
|Ralph A. Sorenson2,27247.51%
|
|Herb Losness2,00541.93%
|
|
|
|Ron Chalmers48910.23%
|
||||
|Jack C. Hillman
|-
|Smoky River
|
|Bernard Lamoureux1,60426.88%|||
|Marvin Moore2,25437.77%
|
|
|
|Victor Tardif2,07434.76%
|
||||
|
|-
|Spirit River-Fairview
|
|Adolph O. Fimrite2,24635.99%
|
|Don Moore1,43923.06%
|
||||
|Grant W. Notley2,40038.46%
|
|Michael Zuk (Ind.)1101.76%|||
|
|-
|St. Albert
|
|Keith Everitt3,59233.36%|||
|William Ernest Jamison4,62342.94%
|
|Robert A. Russell1,66015.42%
|
|Elsie McMillan8788.15%
|
||||
|Keith Everitt
|-
|St. Paul
|
|Raymond Reierson2,04135.07%|||
|Mick Fluker2,66145.72%
|
|Lawrence P. Coutu2093.59%
|
|Laurent (Jeff) Dubois89815.43%
|
||||
|Raymond Reierson
|-
|Stettler
|
|Galen C. Norris2,63147.10%|||
|Jack G. Robertson2,92552.36%
|
|
|
|
|
||||
|Galen C. Norris
|-
|Stony Plain
|
|Ralph A. Jespersen2,78840.12%|||
|William Frederick Purdy3,34848.17%
|
|
|
|Michael Crowson77011.08%
|
||||
|Ralph A. Jespersen
|-
|Taber-Warner|||
|Douglas Miller4,07754.48%
|
|Robert Bogle3,36745.00%
|
|
|
|
|
||||
|Douglas Miller
|-
|Three Hills
|
|Raymond Ratzlaff2,97047.93%|||
|Allan Warrack2,97848.06%
|
|
|
|K. Robert Friesen2203.55%
|
||||
|Raymond Ratzlaff
|-
|Vegreville
|
|Alex W. Gordey2,19132.05%|||
|John S. Batiuk3,04244.49%
|
|
|
|W.B. Welsh1,53722.48%
|
||||
|
|-
|Vermilion-Viking|||
|Ashley H. Cooper2,42046.68%
|
|Tom Newcomb2,23243.06%
|
|
|
|Harry E. Yaremchuk5079.78%
|
||||
|
|-
|Wainwright|||
|Henry A. Ruste3,31163.04%
|
|Clifford Silas Smallwood1,36626.01%
|
|
|
|Gary Luciow54710.42%
|
||||
|Henry A. Ruste
|-
|Wetaskiwin-Leduc|||
|James D. Henderson5,33447.25%
|
|Emanuel Pyrcz4,59040.66%
|
|
|
|Lionel Udenberg1,33611.83%
|
||||
|
|-
|Whitecourt
|
|Clyde Feero2,12533.76%|||
|Peter Trynchy3,09649.19%
|
|Arthur Yates1011.60%
|
|Robert Price92914.76%
|
||||
|
|-
|}

See also
 1948 Electrification Plebiscite
 1957 Liquor Plebiscite
 1967 Daylight Saving Plebiscite
 List of Alberta political parties

References

Works cited

Further reading
 

Alberta
1971
General election
Alberta general election